Plasma Records Entertainment Pvt. Ltd. (Plasma Records)  is a global music label. It was formed in 2000 by Manmohan Waris, Kamal Heer and Sangtar.

History
Plasma Records is the record label for Grind Music & Sound Inc., a digital audio and post-production facility. Grind Music & Sound was opened in 2001 by Sangtar and Michelle Garuik. In 2002 Plasma Records was formed and set up an operation center in Jalandhar, Punjab, India. Manmohan Waris said the reason for Plasma Records was "Many of the top guys in record companies themselves don't have the idea of the pulse of Punjabi music but we are expected to alter stuff and work according to their notions. Now we can do our own stuff without interference." The majority of music and associated materials released by Plasma Records is recorded fully or partially in the Grind Music & Sound studios.
Plasma Records first release, Kamli by Kamal Heer, released in 2000. Since the formation of Plasma Records, Kamal Heer, Manmohan Waris and Sangtar released the majority of their music on Plasma Records. Plasma Records has also produced hits in recent years such as: Punjabi Virsa 2004-Wonderland Live, Nachiye Majajne, Punjabi Virsa 2005-London Live, Masti Three, Punjabi Virsa 2006-Toronto Live, Tasveer-Live, Chan Jiha Gabhru, Punjabi Reloaded, Kankaa, Punjabi Virsa Vancouver Live and Jinday Ni Jinday. Plasma Records has become a well known record company that releases hit albums. Plasma Records most recent releases are Jinday Ni Jinday by Kamal Heer and Dil Te Na Laeen by Manmohan Waris. Plasma Records also organizes the "Punjabi Virsa" tours every year with Kamal Heer, Manmohan Waris and Sangtar. Punjabi Virsa 2010 will be a tour of the UK, US and Canada from June–September 2010. Deepak Bali is the Plasma Records spokesperson and managing director.

Clothing
Plasma Records also sells shirts. They feature designs with Kamal Heer, Manmohan Waris on them and more. They make clothing for men, women, and children. Along with the shirts Plasma Records also sell accessories such as bags, mousepads, buttons, satchels and more. The Plasma records clothing website is Merch.PlasmaRecords.com.

Artists
 Kamal Heer
 Manmohan Waris
 Sangtar
 Gurpreet Ghuggi - Appearance in Shaunki Mela 2003
 Joginder Singh (Bhoutu Shah)
 Harvinder Singh (Kake Shah)
 Paul Sunner
 Resham Sooner

Albums released By Plasma Records

References

External links 
 Plasma Records MySpace Music Page
 Plasma Records on Facebook 
 Official Website

American record labels
Record labels established in 2002
Waris Brothers
Privately held companies of India
2002 establishments in Punjab, India